Homocerynea is a monotypic moth genus of the family Erebidae. Its only species, Homocerynea cleoriformis, was found in the US state of Arizona. Both the genus and species were erected by William Barnes and James Halliday McDunnough in 1913.

Taxonomy
The genus has previously been classified in the subfamily Phytometrinae within Erebidae or in the subfamily Acontiinae of the family Noctuidae.

References

 

Boletobiinae
Noctuoidea genera
Monotypic moth genera